Arbury Banks may refer to 

Arbury Banks, Hertfordshire, a Bronze Age hill fort near Ashwell
Arbury Banks, Northamptonshire, an Iron Age hill fort near Chipping Warden